Gauge 2 (also called 2 gauge or II gauge) is a model railway gauge, originally , then standardised in 1909 at , a 20% reduction and a change in definition: from mm to inch. It has since fallen into disuse. The gauge was introduced by Märklin at the Leipzig toy fair in 1891. Gauge 2 was equivalent to a 1:22.5 scale.

Related scales and gauges

This G gauge at 1:22.5 scale represents  narrow-gauge railways. This scale-gauge combination is sometimes called IIm in European literature.

From this, it follows that G gauge is sometimes, albeit rarely, referred to as 3m. A 2 inch (50.8 mm) gauge of standard gauge locos gives a scale of 1:28.25, not so far off the 1/29 used by some manufactures with  gauge track. In the grand tradition of model rail gauges often being narrower than the full scale equivalent (00 scale being the classic example) this is deemed perfectly acceptable.

See also
16 mm scale
Rail transport modelling scales

External links

 Association of 16mm Narrow Gauge Modellers

References

 Model Railways and Locomotives Magazine Vol. 1 No 8 August 1909

Model railroad scales